Moreton-in-Marsh railway station is a railway station serving the town of Moreton-in-Marsh in Gloucestershire, England. The station and all passenger trains serving it are operated by Great Western Railway.

History
It was once the southern end of the Stratford-upon-Avon to Moreton tramway. It was a passing place on the largely single Cotswold Line, but, since the redoubling was completed in 2011, it is once again a station on normal double track. Between 2000 and 2010, it was the base of Cotswold Rail, a spot-hire company of shunting and mainline locomotives, which went into liquidation.

In August 2019, the direct Great Western train service from London Paddington station to the Moreton-in-Marsh railway station (code MIM) was expected to take under 2 hours. The average time to get to the station from Birmingham was 2.75 hours.

Bilingual signs
Several of the information and direction signs around the station are bilingual – in English and Japanese. This is for the benefit of tourists, as Japanese television promotes the Cotswolds as a holiday destination. They were the idea of station manager Teresa Ceesay, who had noticed the popularity of the town with Japanese tourists and that many asked for information at the station's ticket office. The cost of £350 was met by train operator First Great Western.

Services
Great Western Railway operate all services at Moreton-in-Marsh. The typical off-peak service in trains per hour is:
 1 tph to London Paddington

Gallery

In popular culture
The station was used in the filming of the situation comedy Butterflies.

References

External links

Railway stations in Gloucestershire
DfT Category E stations 
Former Great Western Railway stations
Railway stations in Great Britain opened in 1853
Railway stations served by Great Western Railway
Moreton-in-Marsh